A1 Ko Sa 'Yo (stylized from "Ewan Ko Sa Yo" /  / international title: You're My A1) is a 2016 Philippine television situational comedy series broadcast by GMA Network. Directed by Randy Santiago, it stars Jaclyn Jose, Gardo Versoza and Solenn Heussaff. It premiered on June 2, 2016, on the network's Telebabad line up replacing the Thursday slot of Love Me, Heal Me. The series concluded on November 24, 2016, with a total of 26 episodes.

The series is streaming online on YouTube.

Premise
Digna, a beauty pageant aspirant is in search of her perfect beauty queen as she manages A1 Talent Agency. She is married to Rolly, a marriage counselor, who always fails to give her romance which in turn makes her uptight and short tempered when facing her talents.

Cast and characters

Lead cast
 Jaclyn Jose as Digna Molina
 Solenn Heussaff as Miley
 Gardo Versoza as Rolando "Rolly" Molina

Supporting cast
 Sef Cadayona as Enzo
 Benjamin Alves as Jay
 Roi Vinzon as Primo
 Ervic Vijandre as Erroll
 Denise Barbacena as Kaycee Molina
 Gee Canlas as Tintin
 Mara Alberto as Kath

Guest cast

Ratings
According to AGB Nielsen Philippines' Mega Manila household television ratings, the pilot episode of A1 Ko Sa 'Yo earned a 15.7% rating. While the final episode scored an 8.5% rating in Urban Luzon.

Accolades

References

External links
 

2016 Philippine television series debuts
2016 Philippine television series endings
Filipino-language television shows
GMA Network original programming
Philippine comedy television series
Philippine television sitcoms
Television shows set in the Philippines